Julio Gil Pecharromán (born 1955) is a Spanish historian, specialising in the political history of 20th-century Spain.

Biography 
Born in Madrid in 1955, he studied both History and Journalism at the Complutense University of Madrid (UCM). He earned a PhD in history from the UCM in 1983, reading a dissertation titled Renovación española, una alternativa monárquica a la Segunda República and supervised by Carlos Seco Serrano. The thesis, that dealt with the alfonsine authoritarian Renovación Española party, was re-published in 1985. A lecturer for 8 years at the UCM, Gil Pecharromán was appointed as senior lecturer of Contemporary History at the National University of Distance Education (UNED) in 1987.

Works

References 

 Citations

 Bibliography

 
 
 
 
 
 
 
 
 
 

1955 births
Academic staff of the Complutense University of Madrid
Academic staff of the National University of Distance Education
Historians of the Second Spanish Republic
Historians of Francoist Spain
Academics and writers on the international relations of Spain
Living people